Geoff Hoyle (born 15 April 1945) is an English performer who originated the role of Zazu in the Broadway theatre production of The Lion King. Hoyle has also performed in vaudeville shows, worked with Bill Irwin in "The Pickle Family Circus", performed with Cirque Du Soleil's Nouvelle Expérience, and performed with the Revels.

In 2002, Hoyle performed in "Feast of Fools" at the La Jolla Playhouse in San Diego, California.

In 2007, Hoyle performed in Teatro ZinZanni in both its Seattle, Washington and San Francisco, California venues.

Geoff's son Dan Hoyle has become a well-respected live theater actor in both San Francisco and New York.

References

External links

Living people
Male actors from Kingston upon Hull
Actors from Scarborough, North Yorkshire
1945 births
Male actors from Yorkshire
English people of Scottish descent
People educated at Scarborough High School for Boys